Viktors Bertholds (16 January 1921 – 28 February 2009) was a Livonian and one of the last native speakers of the Livonian language. He was born in the village of Vaide in 1921. Formerly believed to be the last native speaker of Livonian, this title actually belonged to Grizelda Kristiņa, a relative of Bertholds who died in 2013.

References

1921 births
2009 deaths
Livonian people